Örnek is a Turkish surname. Notable people with the surname include:

 Soner Örnek (born 1989), Turkish footballer
 Tolga Örnek (born 1972), Turkish film director, writer, and producer

See also
 Örnek (ornament), ornament

Turkish-language surnames